Jordan Murray (born May 17, 1997) is an American football offensive tackle for the Indianapolis Colts of the National Football League (NFL). He has also played for the Hamilton Tiger-Cats of the Canadian Football League (CFL).

College career
Murray played college football for the North Texas Mean Green from 2015 to 2018, where he appeared in 44 games, playing at both guard and tackle, over the course of four seasons.

Professional career

Upon completing his college eligibility, Murray attended rookie mini-camp with the Seattle Seahawks in 2019, but was not signed by the team. He then played for the Generals of The Spring League in 2020.

Hamilton Tiger-Cats
Murray was signed by the Hamilton Tiger-Cats on July 19, 2021. He began the 2021 season on the practice roster, but was promoted to the team's active roster in Week 4 and made his professional debut, starting at right tackle, on August 27, 2021, against the Montreal Alouettes. Murray played and started in nine regular season games for the Tiger-Cats in 2021 and also started in the East Final. On January 15, 2022, he was released in order to pursue a contract in the National Football League.

Indianapolis Colts
On January 20, 2022, Murray signed a reserve/future contract with the Indianapolis Colts. He was waived on August 30, 2022 and signed to the practice squad the next day. He signed a reserve/future contract on January 9, 2023.

References

External links
Hamilton Tiger-Cats bio

1997 births
Living people
American football offensive linemen
Canadian football offensive linemen
Hamilton Tiger-Cats players
Indianapolis Colts players
North Texas Mean Green football players
People from Coppell, Texas
Players of American football from Texas
Players of Canadian football from Texas
The Spring League players